Matthew Walwyn (born 23 June 1990) is a footballer who plays as a striker. Born in England, he represents Saint Kitts and Nevis at international level.

Career
Born in Kirkham, Walwyn has played in non-league football for Kirkham & Wesham / AFC Fylde, Southport, Skelmersdale United, Chorley, Droylsden and FC United of Manchester.

He earned his first call-up from the Saint Kitts and Nevis national team in June 2015, making two substitute appearances later that year.

Personal life
His father Keith was also a footballer.

Honours
Kirkham & Wesham
FA Vase: 2007–08

References

1990 births
Living people
English footballers
Saint Kitts and Nevis footballers
Saint Kitts and Nevis international footballers
AFC Fylde players
Southport F.C. players
Skelmersdale United F.C. players
Chorley F.C. players
Droylsden F.C. players
F.C. United of Manchester players
Association football forwards